The Chakavak (ultralight training-reconnaissance plane) is an Iranian ultralight training-reconnaissance plane which is able to fly at an altitude of 14000 feet above sea-level for approximately four and a half hours with a speed of 280 kilometers (per hour). Chakavak aircraft possesses 2 seats and an engine. The aircraft weighs 500 kg during flight and 750 kg during takeoff.

This plane was designed by a domestic knowledge-based company, and was joined the Iranian Navy’s aviation fleet in the southern port city of Bandar Abbas, in Hormozgan province on December, 03, 2019. Three of this domestically-manufactured training-reconnaissance planes were delivered to the Iranian Navy's aviation fleet on the mentioned day in 2019.

References

Iranian military aircraft
Aircraft manufactured in Iran
Single-engine aircraft